A febrile seizure, also known as a fever fit or febrile convulsion, is a seizure associated with an increased body temperature but without any intracranial infection. Febrile seizures affect 2–7% of children and are more common in boys than girls. They most commonly occur in children between the ages of 6 months and 5 years with a higher incidence around 18 month of age. Most seizures last less than five minutes, and the child typically recovers quickly.

There are two types of febrile seizures: simple and complex. Simple febrile seizures involve an otherwise healthy child with a single, one episode of generalized seizure lasting less than 15 minutes. Complex febrile seizures have one of more of the following: focal symptoms such as jerking of only one side of the body, duration greater than 15 minutes, or two or more seizures within 24 hours. About 60–70% are classified as simple febrile seizures and 30–40% complex.

Febrile seizures are triggered by fever, typically due to a viral infection. The underlying mechanism is not fully known, but it is thought to involve genetics, environmental factors, brain immaturity, and inflammatory mediators. The rapid rise and decrease of the body temperature is not the main mechanism for febrile seizure occurrence. The diagnosis involves verifying that there is not an infection of the brain, and there have not been prior seizures without a fever. Blood testing, imaging of the brain, or an electroencephalogram (EEG) are typically not needed. Examination to determine the source of the fever is important. In otherwise healthy-looking children, a lumbar puncture is not necessarily required.

 
After a single febrile seizure there is an approximately 35% chance of having another one during childhood. Neither anti-seizure medication nor anti-fever medication are recommended in an effort to prevent further febrile seizures. Efforts to rapidly cool the child’s body during a seizure have not been extensively studied but are not recommended. The long-term outcome of children with febrile seizures is generally excellent with similar academic achievements to other children. There is strong evidence that children with febrile seizures have a slightly increased risk of epilepsy at 2–3% compared to the general population risk of about 1%.

Signs and symptoms
Most febrile seizures occur during the first 24 hours of developing a fever. Signs of typical seizure activity include loss of consciousness, opened upturned eyes, irregular breathing, increased secretions or foaming at the mouth, and the child may look pale or blue (cyanotic). Sometimes, the body stiffens with rhythmic jerk of arms and legs. The child may be incontinent (wet or soil themselves) and may also vomit. After the seizure the child may be seemingly lifeless for several minutes (the postictal state). The occurrence of febrile seizure is often a shock for the family and the postictal state is frequently perceived as part of the seizure.

Types 
There are two main types of febrile seizures: simple and complex. The distinction between simple and complex is based on the risk of subsequent epilepsy. Simple febrile seizures have a very low risk (~2%) of later epilepsy (seizures without fever). The risk of epilepsy following complex febrile seizures depends on the number of complex features with each factor adding about a 5% risk. Thus children with all three factors have a risk of subsequent epilepsy of about 15%. Febrile status epilepticus (FSE) implies that the seizure lasts for longer than 30 minutes. It occurs in up to 5% of febrile seizure cases and has some special long-term concerns (see below).

Causes of fever

Febrile seizures are brought out by fever, usually higher than 38 °C (100.4 °F). The cause of the fever is often a viral illness. The likelihood of a febrile seizure is not related to how high the temperature reaches. It has been long thought that the rate of rise of the body temperature (i.e. how fast the temperature goes up) is important. but it is now clear that it is not the main driver. In children, illnesses that often cause a fever include middle ear infections and viral upper respiratory infections. Other infections associated with febrile seizures include Shigellosis, Salmonellosis, and particularly Roseola (HHV6). How these infections provoke febrile seizures remains unclear.

There is a small chance of a febrile seizure after certain vaccines. The risk is only increased for about 10 days after receiving one of the implicated vaccines during the time when the child is likely to develop a fever as a natural immune response. Implicated vaccines include:

MMRV (measles, mumps, rubella, varicella)
combined diphtheria / tetanus / acellular pertussis / polio / Haemophilus influenzae Type B
diphtheria-tetanus-whole-cell pertussis (not used in North America anymore)
some versions of the pneumococcal vaccine
some types of inactivated influenza vaccine

Overall, vaccination is rarely followed by febrile seizures. The MMRV (measles, mumps, rubella, varicella) vaccine may have a slightly higher risk for febrile seizures than MMR alone. For children with a genetic predisposition for febrile seizures, vaccines may induce a febrile seizure simply by causing fever. The risk of febrile seizures does not appear to outweigh the benefits of routine immunization. Importantly, experiencing a febrile seizure following immunization does not constitute as an adverse reaction.

Genetic
There is evidence that many children with febrile seizures have a genetic predisposition to have febrile seizures.[5] If a child with a febrile seizure has an identical twin (monozygotic), the twin is much more likely to also have a febrile seizure than if the twin is non-identical (dyzygotic). First degree relatives (mother, father, sibling) of a child with febrile seizures have a risk of 10–15% of having a febrile seizure compared with the general risk in the population of only 3–4%. At least 20 chromosomal areas have been linked to febrile seizures and several of the specific mutated genes coming from these areas have been identified (for example, SCNA1, SCN1B, SNCA9A, GPR98,GABRG2).

The exact pattern of inheritance of febrile seizure susceptibility genes is usually unclear. In two situations the mode of inheritance is autosomal dominant – Dravet syndrome and GEFS+. Dravet syndrome is a serious epilepsy syndrome caused by mutations in the gene SCN1A. These children have prolonged, often focal, febrile seizures in the first year of life followed by severe epilepsy. Dravet syndrome is usually not inherited. The syndrome of GEFS+ (genetic epilepsy with febrile seizures plus) is an inherited condition (autosomal dominant) also with mutations in the SCN1A gene. Here, affected family members most often have febrile seizures that may be followed by later development if a variety of types of epilepsy (defined as unprovoked seizures).

First febrile seizure risk factors
Risk factors for an initial febrile seizure include a family history of febrile seizures, delay in going home after birth, possible slow development and possibly attendance at day care (increasing the risk of illnesses). Children with all of these factors have a risk for a first febrile seizure of about 30%.

Other risk factors
Febrile seizures are more likely to occur in children with developmental delay. The effect of socio-economic status has not been extensively studied although lower socio-economic status is associated with a higher rate of infectious illness, so might well contribute to a higher risk of febrile seizures.

Studies in developing countries have shown an association between febrile seizures and iron deficiency anemia. There is also evidence that serum zinc levels are, on average, lower in children with febrile seizures than those without. Unfortunately supplemental zinc treatment does not seem to prevent recurrent febrile seizures.

Mechanism 
The exact underlying mechanism of febrile seizures is still unknown, but it is thought to be multi-factorial involving genetic and environmental factors. Clearly, febrile seizures have something to do with brain maturity but it is unclear why the immature brain is more vulnerable to the effects of fever. One proposal is that inflammatory mediators, particularly cytokines play a role in febrile seizures. There are many cytokines and their roles in the body are complicated; some are important for fever, others affect brain excitability. There is some evidence that children with febrile seizures have different amounts of some cytokines compared with children without febrile seizures. Additionally, there is compelling evidence that febrile seizures are an age-related phenomenon due to increased excitability of the brain during normal development.

Immediate medical care and diagnosis
If the child is still having a seizure at the time of assessment, emergency treatment to stop the seizure should be initiated, usually with intravenous diazepam, lorazepam or midazolam. If intravenous access is difficult then rectal diazepam or intranasal midazolam or intramuscular midazolam may be effective. Once the seizure has stopped then the diagnosis of a febrile seizure can be confirmed by gathering a detailed history including the value of highest temperature recorded, timing of seizure and fever, seizure characteristics, time to return to baseline, vaccination history, illness exposures, and family history. A careful physical exam is important to try to find the source of the fever, exclude meningitis and assess neurological status. Mimics of febrile seizures include shivering, febrile delirium, febrile myoclonus, breath holding spells, convulsive syncope and benign convulsions with mild gastroenteritis.

Meningitis and encephalitis must be excluded which may be challenging since small children may not show the typical signs of meningitis such as stiff neck. Children who are immunized against pneumococcus and Haemophilus influenzae have a low risk of bacterial meningitis although there are other bacteria that may cause meningitis. Viral meningitis or encephalitis may present with a seizure. The most effective way to rule out meningitis/encephalitis is a lumbar puncture with analysis of the cerebrospinal fluid. If a child has recovered quickly from the seizure and is acting normally, then bacterial meningitis is very unlikely and a lumbar puncture is unnecessary. If there is doubt, then a lumbar puncture is recommended because the consequences of delayed treatment of meningitis may be catastrophic. Lumbar puncture is recommended if there are obvious signs and symptoms of meningitis, there is high clinical suspicion, the child has not recovered quickly or if the child lacks immunization against Haemophilus influenzae and pneumococcus or vaccination status is unknown. In particular a lumbar puncture should be considered in children younger than 12 months of age since the signs and symptoms of meningitis may be subtle. Blood tests, brain imaging and an electroencephalogram are generally not needed. However, for complex febrile seizures, EEG and imaging with an MRI of the brain may be considered; although there is no compelling data to support either investigation.

Recurrence of febrile seizures
After a first febrile seizure, the overall risk of another febrile seizure during another febrile illness is 30–40%, and this typically occurs within the next year. The most consistent factor that increases the risk of recurrence is age less than one year. Other factors that increase the risk of recurrence are a family history of febrile seizures, a low temperature (below ) at the time of the first seizure, and a short duration of fever before the first febrile seizure. Children with none of these factors have a recurrence risk of about 20% and those will all of the factors have a risk of about 60–70%. Children with focal febrile seizures may be at increased risk of recurrence although other complex features (2 or more seizures during the same illness and prolonged febrile seizures) do not increase the risk of recurrence.

Prevention of recurrent febrile seizures
Drugs to prevent recurrent febrile seizures have been administered in two ways – continuous daily medication and intermittent medication to be given just at the time of fever. Daily phenytoin, valproate, pyridoxine and zinc sulfate do not prevent further febrile seizures. Daily phenobarbital does reduce the risk of recurrence but about 30% of children treated in this way have significant side effects and it is not recommended. Intermittent use of phenobarbital is ineffective. Intermittent use of rectal or oral diazepam at the time of fever does somewhat decrease the chance of recurrence although side effects are common, especially extreme tiredness which may increase the concern for meningitis. With oral diazepam at the time of fever, 14 children need to be treated to prevent one febrile seizure. Intermittent use of clobazam may be effective but has not been sufficiently studied. There is no evidence to support the use of fever reducing medications (antipyretic medications) such as acetaminophen, ibuprofen or diclofenac the time of fever to prevent a recurrent febrile seizure. Especially when the ambient temperature is high, tepid sponging plus antipyretic medications has a modest effect on reducing the temperature of febrile children although the value of this treatment to prevent febrile seizures is not documented. Rapid cooling methods such as an ice bath or a cold bath should be avoided.

Treatment 

If a child is having a febrile seizure, the following recommendations are made for caregivers:.

Note the start time of the seizure. If the seizure lasts longer than 5 minutes, call an ambulance. Only if previously prescribed, rectal diazepam or intranasal midazolam may be used. The child should be taken immediately to the nearest medical facility for further diagnosis and treatment.
Gradually place the child on a protected surface such as the floor or ground to prevent accidental injury. Do not restrain or hold a child during a convulsion.
Position the child on his or her side or stomach to prevent choking. When possible, gently remove any objects from the child's mouth. Nothing should ever be placed in the child's mouth during a convulsion. These objects can obstruct the child's airway and make breathing difficult.
Seek immediate medical attention if this is the child's first febrile seizure and take the child to the doctor once the seizure has ended to check for the cause of the fever. This is especially urgent if the child shows symptoms of a stiff neck, extreme lethargy, or abundant vomiting, which may be signs of meningitis, an infection over the brain surface.

There is special concern for those with a single seizure lasting greater than 5 minutes, if the child becomes cyanotic, or two consecutive seizures lasting greater than 5 minutes without recovery between the seizures because the seizure is likely to continue for 30 minutes or more (febrile status epilepticus or FSE). Status epilepticus may damage the brain (see below) and should be stopped promptly with medications such as intravenous lorazepam, rectal or intranasal diazepam, or intranasal midazolam. Fortunately, most children with FSE recover completely with normal intelligence.

Prognosis
Although a few concerns have been raised (see below), the long-term outcomes are generally good with little risk of neurological problems or epilepsy. Those who have one febrile seizure have an approximately 30–40% chance of having another one in the next two years, with the risk being greater in those who are younger. Simple febrile seizures do not tend to recur frequently (children tend to outgrow them) and are associated with a slight increase in later epilepsy (about 2–3%) compared with the general public without febrile seizures (1%). As noted above, children with a first febrile convulsion are more likely to have a recurrent febrile seizure if they were young at their first seizure (less than 18 months old), have a family history of a febrile convulsions in first-degree relatives (a parent or sibling), have a short time between the onset of fever and the seizure, had a low degree of fever before their seizure, or have a history of abnormal neurological signs or developmental delay. Children with a first prolonged febrile seizure are not at increased risk of a recurrent febrile seizure; however, if there is a recurrence, it is also likely to be prolonged. Similarly, the overall prognosis after a complex febrile seizure is usually excellent. About 10–15% will eventually develop epilepsy but 85–90% will not. A single, very large study from Denmark suggested that, compared with the normal population, children with complex febrile seizures had a slightly increased risk of death in the two years after their first febrile seizure. This increase appeared mostly to be related to the development of epilepsy or low birth weight, neonatal asphxyia and congenital malformations. Once two years had passed since their first febrile seizure, children with complex febrile seizures no longer had an increased risk of death.

Another, very large study from Denmark has explored the relationship between febrile seizures and subsequent psychiatric disorders. “Compared to the group of children without seizures, the risk of developing a psychiatric disorder was marginally elevated for children with a history of febrile seizures” during the ~20 years after the febrile seizures. A continuing controversial issue is the relationship between prolonged febrile seizures and temporal lobe epilepsy. This issue began with the observation that patients with drug resistant epilepsy beginning in one of their temporal lobes often showed the pathologic features of hippocampal sclerosis when the temporal lobe was surgically removed. (The hippocampus is a part of the temporal lobe that is important for memory formation). Patients with hippocampal sclerosis often had preceding, very long febrile seizures in infancy (Febrile Status Epilepticus FSE). Studies with very long, intense seizures in baboons found that the temporal lobe could be damaged by these seizures. However, not all hippocampal sclerosis is associated with FSE. Major questions that remain incompletely answered are: how often do prolonged febrile seizures cause hippocampal sclerosis and how many children with hippocampal sclerosis develop drug resistant epilepsy? The first question has been addressed by two major studies. One MRI study of children with FSE (FEBSTAT) (>1 hour in most) found about 10% of children have one-sided hippocampal swelling within a few days of the febrile prolonged seizure. A year later, about half of those with early hippocampal swelling had hippocampal sclerosis suggesting that about 5% of children with very long febrile seizure later develop hippocampal sclerosis. How many of these children will develop drug resistant epilepsy is still unknown. Another MRI study found that shortly after FSE, swelling of both hippocampi was common but this resolved 4–8 months later without mesial temporal sclerosis. One long follow-up study suggested that the risk of febrile status followed by hippocampal sclerosis and intractable temporal lobe epilepsy is low – approximately one of every 150 children.

Epidemiology
Febrile seizures happen between the ages of 6 months and 5 years. The peak age for a febrile seizure is 18 months, with the most common age range being 12–30 months of age. They affect between 2–5% of children. They are more common in boys than girls. Febrile seizures can occur in any ethnic group, although there have been higher rates in Guamanians (14%), Japanese (6–9%) and Indians (5–10%).

Conclusions
Nearly all children with febrile seizures have a good long term prognosis. Febrile seizures are not easily anticipated and often recur. Later epilepsy is uncommon. Even prolonged febrile seizures typically do not have sequelae. However, febrile seizures are frightening for parents – most fear that their child is dying during the seizure. Reassurance is nearly always the most important part of treatment, joined with appropriate counseling about risk of recurrent febrile seizures and appropriate management during subsequent seizures.

References

External links 

Pediatrics
Seizure types
Wikipedia medicine articles ready to translate
Wikipedia emergency medicine articles ready to translate